The Mystic Marriage of St Catherine is a c.1585 oil on canvas painting by Annibale Carracci, now in the Gallerie Nazionali di Capodimonte in Naples, Italy. The composition and sfumato effect owe much to Corregio, particularly the latter's painting of the same subject now in the Louvre.

As shown by the label on the reverse, the work formed part of the Farnese collection, where it was mentioned by Carlo Cesare Malvasia (1678) and Giovanni Pietro Bellori (1672), with the latter stating that Carracci painted the work in Parma "for duke Ranuccio Farnese before taking it to Rome "in the duke's name" to give to cardinal Odoardo Farnese.

References

1585 paintings
Paintings in the collection of the Museo di Capodimonte
Paintings by Annibale Carracci
Carracci
Farnese Collection